The Coretta Scott King Young Women's Leadership Academy (CSKYWLA) was opened in Atlanta, Georgia, United States in August 2007. For a short time the academy was simply referred to as "the girls' single gender academy," but it was later named by its first principal, Melody Morgan, in honor of the life and legacy of Coretta Scott King, the civil rights leader and wife of Martin Luther King Jr.

At its inception, the school served girls in grade 6 with plans for expansion to grade 12 by 2014. It graduated its first high school class in 2014. CSKYWLA is a public school in the Atlanta Public Schools system.

Among the staff and students, the acronym for the school's name, CSKYWLA (pronounced "see-skee-WAH-lah"), has been coined as a salutation given the definition "to be empowered by scholarship, non-violence, and social change, my sister."

Single-gender education
CSKYWLA was initiated by Atlanta Public Schools based on the research of Michael Gurian, who asserts that girls and boys have different learning styles. To this effect, teachers at CSKYWLA employ teaching strategies geared toward the general learning styles of girls.

Curriculum
Students at CSKYWLA are immersed in a rigorous academic curriculum, which includes language arts, social studies, and reading. There is also a strong emphasis on math and science, subject areas in which, according to research and tradition, girls tend to struggle more than boys.

Connections
Students at CSKYWLA have an opportunity to take connections classes, including:
 Art
 Band
 Physical Education
 Math
 Reading 
 Dance

Extracurricular activities

 Basketball
 Debate Club
 Cheerleading 
 Cross-Country
 Marching Band
 Softball
 Track and Field

Special honors
Since 2008, sixth grade students at the Coretta Scott King Young Women's Leadership Academy have had the honor of being guest speakers at the annual Martin Luther King Memorial Holiday celebration ceremony at the Ebenezer Baptist Church in Atlanta.

 2008 – Kia Sims
 2009 – Tamira Johnson
 2010 – Brianna Martin
 2011 – Rim Adem (middle school) and Jasmine Woodard (high school)
 2012 – Hikemia Hussein (middle school) and Chelsea Burks (high school)
 2012 – Destiny Gillespie (middle school)
 2017 – Chloe Evans (middle school)

Administration
The middle school is currently under the leadership of Eulonda Washington (Principal), Dr.King (Assistant Principal).

Educational institutions established in 2007
Girls' schools in Georgia (U.S. state)
Atlanta Public Schools high schools
Atlanta Public Schools schools
Public middle schools in Georgia (U.S. state)
Middle schools in Atlanta
2007 establishments in Georgia (U.S. state)